Torunn Isberg  (born 6 July 1949) is a Norwegian artistic gymnast.

She was born in Moss. She competed at the 1968 Summer Olympics.

References

External links 
 

1949 births
Living people
People from Moss, Norway
Norwegian female artistic gymnasts
Olympic gymnasts of Norway
Gymnasts at the 1968 Summer Olympics
Sportspeople from Viken (county)
20th-century Norwegian women